Enkhbayaryn Sodnompiljee is a Mongolian powerlifter.

Career

Para Powerlifting 
Sodnompiljee won the gold medal in paralympic powerlifting in the men's 107 kg event at the 2020 Summer Paralympics held in Tokyo, Japan. Sodnompiljee also represented Mongolia at the 2016 Summer Paralympics held in Rio de Janeiro, Brazil and won the bronze medal in the men's 88 kg event.

At the 2019 World Championships, Sodnompiljee set a new world record of 247 kg in the men's 107 kg category. At the 2017 World Championships, Sodnompiljee won the silver medal in this event.

In 2021, Sodnompiljee won the silver medal in his event at the 2021 World Championships held in Tbilisi, Georgia.

World Classic Bench Press Championships 
At the 2018 World Classic Bench Press Championships, Sodnompiljee bench pressed 242.5 kilograms in the -105 kilogram weight class, claiming the world record, and the gold medal.

The following year, Sodnompilijee bench pressed 247 kilograms in the -105 kilogram weight class, but it was shortly surpassed by Joseph Amendola, who bench pressed 247.5 kilograms. Sodnompilijee won the silver medal.

At the 2022 World Classic Bench Press Championships, Sodnompilijee bench pressed 260 kilograms in the -120 kilogram weight class, claiming another world record, and claiming his second gold medal.

References

External links 

 

Living people
1985 births
Place of birth missing (living people)
Powerlifters at the 2016 Summer Paralympics
Powerlifters at the 2020 Summer Paralympics
Medalists at the 2016 Summer Paralympics
Paralympic bronze medalists for Mongolia
Paralympic medalists in powerlifting
Paralympic powerlifters of Mongolia
Mongolian amputees
21st-century Mongolian people